In molecular biology, the Cbl TKB domain (tyrosine kinase binding domain), also known as the phosphotyrosine binding (PTB) domain is a conserved region found at the N-terminus of Cbl adaptor proteins.  This N-terminal region is composed of three evolutionarily conserved domains: an N-terminal four-helix bundle domain, an EF hand-like domain and a SH2-like domain, which together are known to bind to phosphorylated tyrosine residues.

References

Protein domains